Daniel Stanton Bacon (December 12, 1798May 18, 1866) was an American politician and judge. He served as a member of the Michigan House of Representatives. He was the father of Elizabeth Bacon Custer, wife and later widow of General George Armstrong Custer.

Early life
Daniel S. Bacon was born on December 12, 1798 in Onondaga County, New York to parents Leonard and Elizabeth Stanton Bacon. Daniel later moved to Michigan, and settled in Monroe, Michigan.

Career
In 1822, Bacon taught school on the River Raisin. Bacon engaged in a number of different businesses with his partner, Levi S. Humphrey. One business Bacon engaged in was being a practicing lawyer. Bacon served as a member of the Michigan Territorial Council representing the 5th district from 1832 to 1835. On November 5, 1838, Bacon was elected a member of the Michigan House of Representatives representing the Monroe County district from January 7, 1839 to April 20, 1839. Bacon served as a probate judge for a number of years. He also served as president of a bank in Monroe, and as director of the Michigan Southern Railroad Company.

Personal life
Bacon first married Eleanor Sophia Page. Bacon had four children with Eleanor, including Elizabeth Bacon Custer, an author and the wife of General George Armstrong Custer. Bacon was widowed upon Eleanor's death on August 12, 1854. In 1855, Bacon was remarried to Rhoda Pitts Wells.

Death
Bacon died on May 18, 1866 in Monroe. He was interred at Woodland Cemetery.

References

1798 births
1866 deaths
American bank presidents
Burials at Woodland Cemetery (Monroe, Michigan)
Michigan lawyers
People from Onondaga County, New York
People from Monroe, Michigan
Members of the Michigan Territorial Legislature
Democratic Party members of the Michigan House of Representatives
19th-century American politicians
19th-century American lawyers
19th-century American judges
19th-century American businesspeople